Enyalioides cofanorum, also known commonly as the Cofan woodlizard, Duellman's dwarf iguana, and lagartija de palo cofanes in Spanish, is a species of lizard in the family Hoplocercidae. The species is native to northwestern South America.

Etymology
The specific name, cofanorum, is in honor of the Cofán people of Ecuador.

Geographic range
E. cofanorum is found in Colombia and Ecuador.

Habitat

Description
As an adult E. cofanorum does not exceed  in snout-to-vent length (SVL).

Diet
E. cofanorum preys upon earthworms, insects, and spiders.

Reproduction
E. cofanorum is oviparous. Clutch size is 2–5 eggs.

References

Further reading
Duellman WE (1973). "Descriptions of New Lizards from the Upper Amazon Basin". Herpetologica 29 (3): 228–231. (Enyalioides cofanorum, new species). 
Lewis TR (2002). "Threats facing endemic herpetofauna in the cloud forest reserves of Ecuador". Herpetological Bulletin (79): 18–26. (Enyalioides cofanorum, p. 21).
Torres-Carvajal O, Etheridge R, de Queiroz K (2011). "A systematic revision of Neotropical lizards in the clade Hoplocercinae (Squamata: Iguania)". Zootaxa 2752: 1–44. (Enyalioides cofanorum, p. 12).

Reptiles described in 1973
Lizards of South America
Reptiles of Colombia
Reptiles of Ecuador
Enyalioides
Taxa named by William Edward Duellman